King City Airport was an airport located in King City, Ontario, Canada, north of Toronto. It was located on the northeast intersection of Highway 400 and the King–Vaughan Town Line.

Home to Dominion Helicopters, the EAA Chapter 189 Flying Club, Kevin Healy Aviation Ltd.

The site was purchased by K. J. Beamish Construction Company (now Dufferin Construction North) in the 1980s, which used the former control tower as its head office and the hangars for storage space.

Dufferin Construction moved out of the airport in mid-2020. In early 2021 the buildings were demolished. 

Defunct airports in Ontario
Buildings and structures in King, Ontario
Transport in King, Ontario